Brian Hartzer  (born 1967) is an Australian business executive who is the Chairman of BeforePay. Previously he was the managing director and CEO of Westpac from 2014 to 2020.

Education 
Brian Hartzer graduated from Princeton University.

Banking career 
Hartzer began his career as a consultant at First Manhattan Consulting Group (FMCG), working in New York, San Francisco and Melbourne Australia. Hartzer concluded his time at FMCG as a Vice President (Partner).

After FMCG, Hartzer worked at Australia and New Zealand Banking Group Limited (ANZ), in several roles including running the credit card business, the retail banking operations and managing director of the consumer finance division and CEO of the Australia division.

Hartzer joined Royal Bank of Scotland (RBS) Group's Ulster Bank as CEO UK Retail and Wealth Management in 2009.

After 2 years with RBS, Hartzer returned to Australia. In November 2014, he was announced as the CEO to succeed Gail Kelly as CEO, Australian Financial Services, at Westpac Group in February 2015. Hartzer stepped down as chief executive officer in November 2019 after claims made by AUSTRAC alleged the bank was involved in money laundering, child exploitation and other banking violations. Peter King was appointed to replace him.

In July 2021, Hartzer was named Chairman of BeforePay.

Publishing history

Books
The Leadership Star: A Practical Guide to Building Engagement

References

Princeton University alumni
Westpac people
Living people
1967 births
Australian people of American descent
Australian chief executives